The Winnipeg Warriors were a junior ice hockey team that played in the Western Hockey League. They were founded as an expansion team in 1980, but suffered from attendance problems competing with the Winnipeg Jets of the National Hockey League and ultimately moved to Moose Jaw, Saskatchewan in 1984, becoming the Moose Jaw Warriors. During their time in Winnipeg, the team played at Winnipeg Arena. Winnipeg's struggles at the gate were matched by the Warriors' futility on the ice, as the franchise qualified for the playoffs only once in their four years in Winnipeg: a three-game sweep at the hands of the Lethbridge Broncos in 1983.  The Warriors 1983–84 record of 9–63–0 is the second-worst 72 game mark in league history.  Only the Victoria Cougars' record of 5–65–2 in 1989–90 was worse.

Season-by-season record

Note: GP = Games played, W = Wins, L = Losses, T = Ties, Pts = Points, GF = Goals for, GA = Goals against

NHL alumni
Darren Boyko
Ed Chadwick
Randy Gilhen
Mike Keane
Mick Vukota
Richard Zemlak

See also
List of ice hockey teams in Manitoba

Defunct ice hockey teams in Manitoba
Ice hockey teams in Winnipeg
Defunct Western Hockey League teams